Karl Fredrik Dahlgren (1791–1844) was a Swedish poet.

At a time when literary partisanship ran high in Sweden, and the writers divided themselves into Goths and Phosphorists, Dahlgren made himself indispensable to the Phosphorists by his polemical activity.

Life
He was born at Stensbruk in Östergötland on 20 June 1791.

In 1825 he published  ("The Tower of Babel"), a satire, and a comedy, ; and in 1828 two volumes of poems. In 1829 he was appointed to an ecclesiastical post in Stockholm, which he held until his death. In a series of odes and dithyrambic pieces, entitled  (1819, 1820), he strove to emulate the wonderful lyric genius of Carl Michael Bellman, of whom he was a student and follower. In 1834 he collected his poems in one volume; and in 1837 appeared his last book,  ("Steamboat Songs"). In 1837 he was the secretary for Pro Fide et Christianismo, a Christian education society. He was also a member of the Par Bricole society. On 1 May 1844 he died at Stockholm.

Dahlgren is one of the best humorous writers that Sweden has produced; but he was perhaps at his best in realistic and idyllic description. 
His little poem of Zephyr and the Girl, which is to be found in every selection from Swedish poetry, is a good example of his sensuous and ornamented style. 
His works were collected and published after his death by A. J. Arwidsson (Stockholm, 1847–1852).

References

Attribution

1791 births
1844 deaths
People from Norrköping Municipality
People from Östergötland
Swedish-language poets
19th-century Swedish poets
19th-century male writers